Spirals in Hyperspace is the tenth studio album by English band Ozric Tentacles. It was released in 2004 on Magna Carta Records.

Track listing

 "Chewier" – 5:26
 "Spirals in Hyperspace" – 9:51
 "Slinky" – 8:39
 "Toka Tola" – 7:46
 "Plasmoid" – 5:17
 "Oakum" – 9:03
 "Akasha" – 7:27
 "Psychic Chasm" – 8:44
 "Zoemetra" – 7:23

The band
Ed Wynne – guitar, keyboards, mind colours, & programming on all tracks
Stuart "Schoo" Fisher - drums on Chewier, Oakum, & Zoemetra
Seaweed - synths & bubbles on Oakum & kindling on Chewier
John Egan - ney, blul, duduk & silver flute on Oakum & Zoemetra
Zia Geelani - bass on Oakum
Merv Pepler (Eat Static) - drum programming & samps'n'stuff on Psychic Chasm
Brandi Wynne – glide bass on Chewier, spikes on Plasmoid & tea on Psychic Chasm
Steve Hillage & Miquette Giraudy (Gong, System 7) - guitar & additional synths on Akasha

References

2004 albums
Ozric Tentacles albums